Bogdan Khanenko (1848, Surazhsky Uyezd – 1917, Kiev) was a Ukrainian-born lawyer, sugar industrialist, and art collector. He is a member of a well known Ukrainian Khanenko family, which includes such personalities like Mykhailo Khanenko and Danylo Khanenko. Along with his wife Varvara, Bogdan Khanenko is known for his philanthropic activities towards art and its preservation in the Russian Empire.

Biography 
Khanenko family which includes such personalities like Mykhailo Khanenko and Danylo Khanenko was of Cossack origin. On his mother's side, he belonged to the Russian-German von Nilus family.
In 1871 Khanenko graduated from the law department of Moscow University and served as a judge in St. Petersburg and Warsaw. By the end of 1880, he retired and settled in Kiev, marrying Varvara Tereshchenko, daughter of sugar industrialist Nikolai Tereshchenko.

Khanenko was a famous patron of the arts, and during his forty-year collection activity he purchased works from art auctions in Vienna, Berlin, Paris, and Madrid. His most valuable purchases resulted from his trips to Italy, where he obtained approximately 100 pieces through auctions in Rome and Florence, and with the assistance of Alexander Rizzoni, a Russian-born painter living in Rome. He built a Museum of Western and Oriental Art with his unique and private foreign art collection. After his death, the museum opened up to the public and was named after the couple.

In 1906 Bogdan Khanenko was elected to the State Council of Imperial Russia.

Varvara Khanenko was evicted from his own house by the Soviets and had to live, for the last months of her life, in the house of his maidservant Dunyasha.

References

 The Bogdan and Varvara Khanenko Arts Museum at the Museum World of Ukraine: in Russian. in Ukrainian
Prokopenko, The gift of Khanenko, Zerkalo Nedeli (The Mirror Weekly), February 4–10, 1995. 

Ukrainian art collectors
Businesspeople from Kyiv
Ukrainian judges
1848 births
1917 deaths
Moscow State University alumni
Russian judges
Russian art collectors
Members of the State Council (Russian Empire)
Octobrists
Tereshchenko family
Bogdan